Sokola may refer to the following:

People
David Sokola (born July 28, 1955), American politician

Places
Sokola, Lower Silesian Voivodeship (south-west Poland)
Sokola, Lublin Voivodeship (east Poland)
Sokola Dąbrowa, village in Lubusz Voivodeship
Sokola Góra, Zgierz County, village in Łódź Voivodeship
Sokola Góra, Radomsko County, village in Łódź Voivodeship

Other
Sokola coat of arms, a Polish Coat of Arms